The Bhimavaram–Narasapur branch line is a railway junction connecting  and  railway stations in the Indian state of Andhra Pradesh. It is under the administrative jurisdiction of South Coast Railway zone.

References

Rail transport in Andhra Pradesh

Transport in West Godavari district
5 ft 6 in gauge railways in India